The 2016 DC Solar 350 was the 18th stock car race of the 2016 NASCAR Camping World Truck Series, the second race of the Round of 8, and the 20th iteration of the event. The race was held on Saturday, October 1, 2016, in North Las Vegas, Nevada, at Las Vegas Motor Speedway, a 1.5-mile (2.4 km) permanent tri-oval shaped racetrack. The race took the scheduled 146 laps to complete. Tyler Reddick, driving for Brad Keselowski Racing, dominated the majority of the race, and earned his third career NASCAR Camping World Truck Series win, and his first of the season. To fill out the podium, Daniel Hemric, driving for Brad Keselowski Racing, and Cole Custer, driving for JR Motorsports, would finish 2nd and 3rd, respectively.

Background 

Las Vegas Motor Speedway, located in Clark County, Nevada in Las Vegas, Nevada about 15 miles northeast of the Las Vegas Strip, is a  complex of multiple tracks for motorsports racing. The complex is owned by Speedway Motorsports, Inc., which is headquartered in Charlotte, North Carolina.

Entry list 

 (R) denotes rookie driver.
 (i) denotes driver who is ineligible for series driver points.

Practice

First practice 
The first practice session was held on Saturday, October 1, at 8:30 am PST, and would last for 60 minutes.

Final practice 
The final practice session was held on Saturday, October 1, at 10:00 am PST, and would last for 60 minutes.

Qualifying 
Qualifying was held on Saturday, October 1, at 3:10 pm PST. Since Las Vegas Motor Speedway is at least 1.5 miles (2.4 km) in length, the qualifying system was a single car, single lap, two round system where in the first round, everyone would set a time to determine positions 13–32. Then, the fastest 12 qualifiers would move on to the second round to determine positions 1–12.

Full qualifying results

Race results

Standings after the race 

Drivers' Championship standings

Note: Only the first 8 positions are included for the driver standings.

References 

NASCAR races at Las Vegas Motor Speedway
October 2016 sports events in the United States
2016 in sports in Nevada